Glengall Grove is a street on the Isle of Dogs, in London's East End. The street was once part of Glengall Road which stretched across most of the Isle of Dogs.

History

Glengall Street appears on Joseph Cross's New Plan of London for 1861, but not on his previous plan of 1850. The name comes from the Richard Butler, 2nd Earl of Glengall who had married  Margaret Lauretta Mellish, the daughter of William Mellish, in 1834. Margaret and her sister inherited a large amount of land on the Isle of Dogs, known as the Mellish Estate. After becoming the Countess of Glengall, the trustees of the Mellish inheritance successfully challenged the Earl of Glengall, who was declared bankrupt before dying in 1858. It was thus during this period that Glengall Street and the nearby Mellish Street were named.

Football club Millwall Rovers' first ever fixture was held on Glengall Road, on 3 October 1885.

Legacy

Glengall Bridge on the current Pepper Street carries the name "Glengall" and is located at the same place that a previous bridge linked the eastern and western parts of Glengall Grove.

References

Streets in the London Borough of Tower Hamlets
Millwall